Chih Ree Sun (May 6, 1923 – January 5, 2007) was a Chinese American physicist most noted for breaking new ground in modern physics as a professor at the State University of New York in Albany.  He spent time writing Chinese poetry after he retired.

Biography

Early years
Born in the Anhui province, Sun started college in Kunming, but later went to India during World War II.

He then taught and conducted research for 40 years in high-energy physics, retiring from the State University of New York at Albany in 1995 after serving on the faculty for 27 years. Sun moved to Florida the following year.

Arts in retirement 
After he retired, he became an author of Chinese poetry. His love for ballroom dancing took him across Broward and Palm Beach counties.

A devoted member of the Coral Springs Chinese Cultural Association, Chih-Ree Sun also taught t'ai chi classes there with his wife, Felicia. He died, aged 83, after a two-year struggle with kidney and lung cancer. He was a great grandfather.

He also published a collection of more than 200 original poems shortly before he died. In one poem, he told of how his older sister gave him the last space inside a bomb shelter and waited outside while the Japanese attacked during the second Sino-Japanese war. Both survived.

Determined to help children attend Chinese school at the Chinese Cultural Association, Sun requested a scholarship fund be established in his name there. Proceeds from the book's sale will go to the scholarship fund, she said.

External links 
Information

 孫至銳20日出殯將捐奠儀
 孫至銳紀念特輯

1923 births
2007 deaths
20th-century American educators
Chinese emigrants to the United States
Deaths from kidney cancer
Deaths from lung cancer in Florida
People from Albany, New York
People from Coral Springs, Florida
State University of New York faculty
Physicists from Anhui
Chinese Civil War refugees
Chinese poets